The Church of Jesus Christ of Latter-day Saints in Fiji refers to the Church of Jesus Christ of Latter-day Saints (LDS Church) and its members in Fiji. The first branch (small congregation) was formed in 1955. As of December 31, 2021, there were 22,827 members in 52 congregations in Fiji, making it the second largest body of LDS Church members in Melanesia behind Papua New Guinea.

History

LDS Church leaders, apostle David O. McKay and Hugh J. Cannon, visited the Fiji Islands in 1921 and did not feel impressed at that time to introduce the church to these islands. The first known member to live in Fiji was Mary Ashley, who moved to Suva from Tonga in 1924. The first regular missionary visits to Fiji began in 1953, with the first permanently assigned missionaries arriving the next year. On 23 January 1954, Ashley's eleven-year-old daughter, Margaret, was baptized at Laucala Beach Estate. This was the church's first baptism performed and recorded in Fiji. The church's first recorded meeting was held on 25 July 1954, in the Matanisiga Hall in Toorak, Suva.

Fijian men were initially restricted from getting the priesthood but this changed in 1955, when the church determined that Fijians were Melanesian in origin and eligible for ordination.   After visiting the island in 1955, McKay, who was then serving as church president, opened the first branch in Fiji and called on missionaries to increase outreach to Fijians and Indians.

Membership growth began in earnest as the church focused resources and efforts on the Fiji islanders.  Gideon Dolo was the first Fijian to serve a mission, leaving in February 1959. In 1975, the church-owned Fiji Technical College was opened. The first stake in Fiji, the Suva Fiji Stake was organized 12 June 1983, with Inosi Naga as president. A stake was later created in Viti Levu, with districts created in Vanua Levu and Taveuni due to congregation and membership expansion.  The number of congregations increased rapidly in the 1990s, from 19 to 41. The Suva Fiji Temple was dedicated on 18 June 2000.  Congregation and membership growth continues to trend upwards in the 2000s and 2010s.

As of 2019, the LDS Church operated two Fijian-speaking congregations outside of Fiji – both of which were located in California: the Sacramento 4th Ward and the San Francisco 2nd Branch. In 2020, the LDS Church temporarily canceled services and other public gatherings in response to the spread of the coronavirus pandemic which resumed online and/or in person, depending on the congregation.

Stakes and Districts
As of February 2023, the following stakes and district exist in Fiji:

The Motusa Rotuma Branch and Fiji Suva Mission Branch are not part of a stake or district.  The Fiji Suva Mission Branch serves families and individuals in Fiji, Wallis and Futuna, and Tuvalu that are not in proximity of a meetinghouse.

Mission
Fiji Suva Mission was organized on July 23 1971. As of 2023, it encompasses the nations of Fiji, Tuvalu, and Wallis and Futuna.

Tuvalu
The LDS Church reported having 335 members with a branch in Funafuti. The Funafuti Branch was organized November 11, 1985.

Temples

On June 18, 2000 the Suva Fiji Temple was dedicated by church president Gordon B. Hinckley.

Prominent members
Bruce Ferguson was a professional rugby player for the Japanese National Team from 1993 to 1997.

Semi Radradra professional rugby player, two time Olympic gold medalist in 2016, 2020.

Taniela B. Wakolo was sustained as an LDS Church general authority on April 1, 2017.

Taito Waradi is a Fijian business and government leader who has served as general manager of Telecom Fiji, as President of the Fiji Chamber of Commerce and Industry, and as the Government Minister for Commerce.

See also
 Religion in Fiji: Latter Day Saints

References

External links
 The Church of Jesus Christ of Latter-day Saints (Fiji) - Official Site
 The Church of Jesus Christ of Latter-day Saints Pacific Area
 ComeUntoChrist.org Latter-day Saints Visitor site
 The Church of Jesus Christ of Latter-day Saints Official site